Ranst is a municipality in the Belgian province of Antwerp. The municipality comprises the towns of Broechem (townhall), Oelegem, and Ranst (postoffice) proper. In 2021, Ranst had a total population of 19,249.

Notable people
 Wouter Berthout van Ranst
 Jozef Simons, (1888-1948), writer and poet, born in Oelegem.

Partnership
  Herbstein, since 1968.

References

External links 
 
  Official website

 
Municipalities of Antwerp Province
Populated places in Antwerp Province